Yeniyol is a village in the Ardeşen District, Rize Province, in Black Sea Region of Turkey. Its population is 409 (2021).

History 
According to list of villages in Laz language book (2009), name of the village is Oce. Most villagers are ethnically Hemshin.

Geography

References

Villages in Ardeşen District